The  Piper PA-14 Family Cruiser is an American-built small touring aircraft of the late 1940s.

Design and development
Piper Aircraft had built the PA-12 Super Cruiser three-seat touring aircraft between early 1946 and March 1948. In 1947, the PA-12 design was adapted to a four-seat layout by widening the cabin by five inches at the instrument panel and adding slotted flaps. The original high-wing and fixed tailwheel undercarriage layout features were retained. The PA-14 prototype made its first flight from the company's Lock Haven Pennsylvania factory on 21 March 1947.

Production and operations
A second PA-14 was completed on 6 February 1948 and the first customer deliveries were made later that year. 238 examples were completed,  most being sold to private owner pilots in the United States, but overseas sales included several to France. The aircraft was launched at a time of serious financial difficulty for the company, and indeed, soon after the release of the Family Cruiser, Piper was placed in receivership, from which it later successfully emerged. 126 examples remained registered in the United States in April 2011, of which 81 were based in Alaska and 13 aircraft were registered in Canada.

Specifications

See also

References

 Peperell, Roger, Piper Aircraft and their forerunners, Air-Britain (Publishers) Ltd, 1987, 
 Simpson, Rod, ''General Aviation Handbook, Midland Publishing,  2005,

External links

Single-engined tractor aircraft
High-wing aircraft
1940s United States civil utility aircraft
Family Cruiser
Aircraft first flown in 1947